Playwrights Horizons is a not-for-profit Off-Broadway theater located in New York City dedicated to the support and development of contemporary American playwrights, composers, and lyricists, and to the production of their new work.

Under the leadership of Artistic Director Adam Greenfield and Managing Director Leslie Marcus, Playwrights Horizons encourages the new work of veteran writers while nurturing an emerging generation of theater artists. Writers are supported through every stage of their growth with a series of development programs: script and score evaluations, commissions, readings, musical theater workshops, Studio and Mainstage productions.

History
Playwrights Horizons was founded in 1971 at the Clark Center Y by Robert Moss, before moving to 42nd Street in 1977 where it was one of the original theaters that started Theater Row by converting adult entertainment venues into off Broadway theaters. The current building was built on the site of a former burlesque, which previously served as the off-Broadway Maidman Playhouse between 1960 and 1966.

André Bishop served as Artistic Director from 1981 to 1991, followed by Don Scardino who served through 1995. Tim Sanford served as Artistic Director from 1996 until July 2020, serving as "outgoing Artistic Director" during the 2020-2021 season. Adam Greenfield took over as Artistic Director in July 2020. 

Playwrights Horizons has worked with over 375 writers and is the recipient of numerous awards and honors. In 2005, it was among 406 New York City arts and social service institutions to receive part of a $20 million grant from the Carnegie Corporation, which was made possible through a donation by New York City mayor Michael Bloomberg.

Playwrights Horizons' auxiliary programs include the Playwrights Horizons Theater School, which is affiliated with NYU's Tisch School of the Arts, and Ticket Central, a central box office that supports the off-Broadway performing arts community.

Notable productions
Past productions include seven Pulitzer Prize winners: 
 Michael R. Jackson's A Strange Loop (2020)
 Annie Baker's The Flick (2014)
 Bruce Norris's Clybourne Park (2011)
 Doug Wright's I Am My Own Wife (2004)
 Wendy Wasserstein's The Heidi Chronicles (1989)
 Alfred Uhry's Driving Miss Daisy (1988)
 Stephen Sondheim and James Lapine's Sunday in the Park with George (1985)

Other notable productions include:
 In Trousers, March of the Falsettos, and Falsettoland – William Finn
 The Dining Room – A.R. Gurney
 Assassins – Stephen Sondheim and John Weidman
 The Bubbly Black Girl Sheds Her Chameleon Skin – Kirsten Childs
 James Joyce's The Dead – Richard Nelson and Shaun Davey
 Lobby Hero – Kenneth Lonergan
 Betty's Summer Vacation and Sister Mary Ignatius Explains It All For You – Christopher Durang 
 Goodnight Children Everywhere and Franny's Way – Richard Nelson
 The Substance of Fire – Jon Robin Baitz
 Marvin's Room – Scott McPherson
 Floyd Collins – Adam Guettel and Tina Landau
 Violet – Jeanine Tesori and Brian Crawley
 Small Tragedy and Prayer for My Enemy – Craig Lucas
 Grey Gardens – Doug Wright, Scott Frankel, and Michael Korie
 This – Melissa James Gibson
 Clybourne Park and The Pain and the Itch – Bruce Norris
 Circle Mirror Transformation and The Flick – Annie Baker
 Detroit – Lisa D'Amour
 Dance Nation — Clare Barron
 Heroes of the Fourth Turning – Will Arbery
 The Treasurer - Max Posner

References

External links

1971 establishments in New York City
42nd Street (Manhattan)
Hell's Kitchen, Manhattan
Off-Broadway theaters
Theatres completed in 1971
Theatres in Manhattan
Theatre companies in New York City